

Bandy

World Championship
 January 29 – February 5: 2017 Bandy World Championship in  Sandviken
 Division A:  defeated , 4–3, to win their twelfth overall Bandy World Championship title.  took the bronze medal.
 Division B:  defeated , 4–3, in the final, and is qualified for Division A next year, replacing .  took third place.

Youth Bandy World Championships
 January (TBC): 2017 Bandy World Championship Y-19 in  Syktyvkar Champions:  Russia
 February 2 – 4: 2017 Bandy World Championship Y-17 in  Varkaus Champions:  Russia
 February 24 – 26: 2017 Bandy World Championship G-17 in  Irkutsk Champions:  Sweden

World Cup
 Final game, 2016 Bandy World Cup, October 16: Västerås SK (Sweden) - Villa Lidköping BK (Sweden), 4–1

World Cup Women
 Final game, 2016 Bandy World Cup Women, October 30: Rekord Irkutsk (Russia) - Hammarby IF (Sweden), 4-1

National champions
 Finland: Veiterä (men), Sudet (women)
 Norway: Stabæk IF (men), Stabæk IF (women)
 Russia: SKA-Neftyanik Khabarovsk (men), Rekord Irkutsk (women)
 Sweden: Edsbyns IF (men), Kareby IS (women)
 United States: Dinkytown Dukes (men)

Bobsleigh and Skeleton

International Bobsleigh and Skeleton events
 January 9 – 15: 2017 IBSF European Championship in  Winterberg
 Two-man bobsleigh winners:  (Francesco Friedrich & Thorsten Margis)
 Four-man bobsleigh winners:  (Johannes Lochner, Sebastian Mrowka, Joshua Bluhm, & Christian Rasp)
 Women's bobsleigh winners:  (Mariama Jamanka & Annika Drazek)
 Skeleton winners:  Martins Dukurs (m) /  Jacqueline Lölling (f)
 January 24 – 28: 2017 IBSF Junior Skeleton World Championships in  Sigulda
 Junior Skeleton winners:  Nikita Tregubov (m) /  Yulia Kanakina (f)
 January 27 – 29: 2017 IBSF Junior Bobsleigh World Championships in  Winterberg
 Junior Two-man bobsleigh winners:  (Richard Oelsner & Alexander Schüeller)
 Junior Four-man bobsleigh winners:  (Bennet Buchmueller, Benedikt Hertel, Niklas Scherer, & Costa Tonga Laurenz)
 Junior Women's bobsleigh winners:  (Mica McNeill & Mica Moore)
 January 29 – February 5: 2017 IBSF Para-Sport World Championships in  St. Moritz
 Seated Para-bobsleigh winner:  Arturs Klots
 February 13 – 26: IBSF World Championships 2017 in  Schönau am Königsee
 Note 1: This event was supposed to be hosted in Sochi, but the IBSF took it back, due to the release of the McLaren Report.
 Note 2: There was a tie for first place in the four-man bobsleigh event here.
 Two-man bobsleigh winners:  (Francesco Friedrich & Thorsten Margis)
 Four-man bobsleigh #1 winners:  (Johannes Lochner, Matthias Kagerhuber, Joshua Bluhm, & Christian Rasp)
 Four-man bobsleigh #2 winners:  (Francesco Friedrich, Candy Bauer, Martin Grothkopp, & Thorsten Margis)
 Women's bobsleigh winners:  (Elana Meyers & Kehri Jones)
 Skeleton winners:  Martins Dukurs (m) /  Jacqueline Lölling (f)
 Team winners:  (Axel Jungk, Mariama Jamanka, Franziska Bertels, Jacqueline Lölling, Johannes Lochner, & Christian Rasp)

2016–17 Bobsleigh and Skeleton World Cup
 November 28, 2016 – December 3, 2016: #1 in  Whistler, British Columbia
 Two-man bobsleigh winners:  (Francesco Friedrich & Thorsten Margis)
 Four-man bobsleigh winners:  (Alexander Kasjanov, Alexey Zaitsev, Aleksei Pushkarev, & Maxim Belugin)
 Women's bobsleigh winners:  (Kaillie Humphries & Cynthia Appiah)
 Skeleton winners:  Yun Sung-bin (m) /  Elisabeth Vathje (f) 
 December 12 – 17, 2016: #2 in  Lake Placid, New York
 Two-man bobsleigh winners:  (Steven Holcomb & Sam McGuffie)
 Four-man bobsleigh winners:  (Rico Peter, Janne Bror van der Zijde, Simon Friedli, & Thomas Amrhein)
 Women's bobsleigh winners:  (Jamie Greubel & Aja Evans)
 Skeleton winners:  Aleksandr Tretyakov (m) /  Janine Flock (f)
 January 2 – 8: #3 in  Altenberg, Saxony
 Two-man bobsleigh winners:  (Francesco Friedrich & Martin Grothkopp)
 Four-man bobsleigh winners:  (Johannes Lochner, Sebastian Mrowka, Joshua Bluhm, & Christian Rasp)
 Women's bobsleigh winners:  (Kaillie Humphries & Melissa Lotholz)
 Skeleton winners:  Christopher Grotheer (m) /  Jacqueline Lölling (f)
 January 9 – 15: #4 in  Winterberg
 Two-man bobsleigh winners:  (Francesco Friedrich & Thorsten Margis)
 Four-man bobsleigh winners:  (Johannes Lochner, Sebastian Mrowka, Joshua Bluhm, & Christian Rasp)
 Women's bobsleigh winners:  (Elana Meyers & Kehri Jones)
 Skeleton winners:  Martins Dukurs (m) /  Elisabeth Vathje (f)
 January 16 – 22: #5 in  St. Moritz
 Two-man bobsleigh winners:  (Johannes Lochner & Christian Rasp)
 Four-man bobsleigh winners:  (Oskars Ķibermanis, Jānis Jansons, Matiss Miknis, & Raivis Zirups)
 Women's bobsleigh winners:  (Elana Meyers & Briauna Jones)
 Skeleton winners:  Martins Dukurs (m) /  Mirela Rahneva (f)
 January 23 – 29: #6 in  Schönau am Königsee
 Two-man bobsleigh winners:  (Johannes Lochner & Joshua Bluhm)
 Four-man bobsleigh winners:  (Johannes Lochner, Matthias Kagerhuber, Joshua Bluhm, & Christian Rasp)
 Women's bobsleigh winners:  (Elana Meyers & Kehri Jones)
 Skeleton winners:  Aleksandr Tretyakov (m) /  Jacqueline Lölling (f)
 January 30 – February 5: #7 in  Innsbruck (Igls)
 Two-man bobsleigh winners:  (Francesco Friedrich & Thorsten Margis)
 Four-man bobsleigh winners:  (Oskars Melbārdis, Daumants Dreiškens, Arvis Vilkaste, & Jānis Strenga)
 Women's bobsleigh winners:  (Elana Meyers & Lolo Jones)
 Skeleton winners:  Martins Dukurs (m) /  Tina Hermann (f)
 March 13 – 19: #8 (final) in  Pyeongchang
 Two-man bobsleigh winners:  (Francesco Friedrich & Thorsten Margis)
 Four-man bobsleigh winners:  (Alexander Kasjanov, Aleksei Pushkarev, Vasilij Kondratenko, & Alexey Zaitsev)
 Women's bobsleigh winners:  (Jamie Greubel & Aja Evans)
 Skeleton winners:  Martins Dukurs (m) /  Jacqueline Lölling (f)

2016–17 IBSF Para-Sport World Cup
 November 15 – 23, 2016: Para-Sport World Cup #1 in  Park City
 Seated Para-bobsleigh winners:  Brian McPherson (#1) /  Lonnie Bissonnette (#2)
 Para-skeleton winners:  Matthew Richardson (#1) /  Eric Eierdam (#2)
 January 15 – 21: Para-Sport World Cup #2 in  Lillehammer
 Seated Para-bobsleigh winners:  Barry Schroeder (#1) /  Alvils Brants (#2)
 Para-skeleton winner:  Eric Eierdam
 January 23 – 28: Para-Sport World Cup #3 (final) in  Oberhof
 Seated Para-bobsleigh winner:  Arturs Klots (2 times)

2016–17 IBSF Intercontinental Cup
 November 6 – 11, 2016: IBSF Intercontinental Cup #1 in  Innsbruck (Igls)
 Skeleton winners:  Kilian von Schleinitz (m; 2 times) /  Kimberley Bos (f; 2 times)
 November 13 – 18, 2016: IBSF Intercontinental Cup #2 in  Schönau am Königsee
 Skeleton winners:  Kilian von Schleinitz (m; 2 times) /  Anna Fernstaedt (f; 2 times)
 January 9 – 13: IBSF Intercontinental Cup #3 in  Calgary
 Men's skeleton winners:  Egor Veselov (#1) /  Pavel Kulikov (#2)
 Women's skeleton winner:  Lanette Prediger (2 times)
 January 22 – 27: IBSF Intercontinental Cup #4 (final) in  Lake Placid, New York
 Men's skeleton winners:  John Daly (#1) /  Egor Veselov (#2) 
 Women's skeleton winner:  Savannah Graybill (2 times)

2016-17 IBSF European Cup
 October 31 – November 6, 2016: IBSF European Cup #1 in  Sigulda
 Two-man bobsleigh winners #1:  (Oskars Ķibermanis & Matiss Miknis)
 Two-man bobsleigh winners #2:  (Oskars Ķibermanis & Jānis Jansons)
 Women's bobsleigh winners #1:  (Elfje Willemsen & Sophie Vercruyssen)
 Women's bobsleigh winners #2:  (Elfje Willemsen & Sara Aerts)
 Skeleton winners:  Ivo Steinbergs (m) /  Anna Fernstaedt (f)
 November 6 – 11, 2016: IBSF European Cup #2 in  Igls
 Skeleton winners:  Fabian Kuechler (m; 2 times) /  Tamara Seer (f; 2 times)
 November 10 – December 4, 2016: IBSF European Cup #3 in  Schönau am Königsee
 Two-man bobsleigh winners #1:  (Johannes Lochner & Joshua Bluhm)
 Two-man bobsleigh winners #2:  (Richard Oelsner & Alexander Schueller)
 Four-man bobsleigh winners:  (#1);  (#2);  (#3)
 Women's bobsleigh winners #1:  (Elfje Willemsen & Sophie Vercruyssen)
 Women's bobsleigh winners #2:  (Maria Oshigiri & Arisa Kimishima)
 Women's bobsleigh winners #3:  (Sabina Hafner & Eveline Rebsamen)
 Skeleton #1 winners:  Felix Seibel (m) /  Maxi Just (f)
 Skeleton #2 winners:  Dominic Rady (m) /  Tamara Seer (f)
 December 12 – 18, 2016: IBSF European Cup #3 in  Altenberg, Saxony
 Two-man bobsleigh winners #1:  (Richard Oelsner & Alexander Schueller)
 Two-man bobsleigh winners #2:  (Oskars Ķibermanis & Daumants Dreiškens)
 Four-man bobsleigh winners: 
 Women's bobsleigh winners:  (Elfje Willemsen & Sophie Vercruyssen)
 January 8 – 15: IBSF European Cup #4 in  St. Moritz
 Two-man bobsleigh winners:  (Oskars Melbārdis & Daumants Dreiškens)
 Four-man bobsleigh winners:  (2 times)
 Women's bobsleigh winners:  (Sabina Hafner & Jasmin Naef)
 Skeleton winners:  Felix Keisinger (m) /  Maxi Just (f)
 January 15 – 20: IBSF European Cup #5 in  Altenberg, Saxony
 Skeleton winners:  Dominic Rady (m; 2 times) /  Tamara Seer (f; 2 times)
 January 22 – 29: IBSF European Cup #6 (final) in  Winterberg
 Two-man bobsleigh winners:  (Richard Oelsner & Marc Rademacher)
 Four-man bobsleigh winners:  (2 times)
 Women's bobsleigh winners:  (Mica McNeill & Montell Douglas)

2016-17 IBSF North American Cup
 November 6 – 14, 2016: IBSF North American Cup #1 in  Calgary
 Two-man bobsleigh #1 winners:  (Nick Cunningham & Nathan Gilsleider)
 Two-man bobsleigh #2 winners:  (Kim Dong-hyun & Jun Jung-lin)
 Four-man bobsleigh winners:  (2 times)
 Women's bobsleigh #1 winners:  (Kaillie Humphries & Cynthia Appiah)
 Women's bobsleigh #2 winners:  (Alysia Rissling & Catherine Medeiros)
 Skeleton #1 winners:  Ander Mirambell (m; 2 times) /  Madison Charney (f)
 Women's Skeleton #2 winner:  MUN Ra-young
 November 16 – 26, 2016: IBSF North American Cup #2 in  Whistler, British Columbia
 Two-man bobsleigh #1 winners:  (Alexander Kasjanov & Aleksei Pushkarev)
 Two-man bobsleigh #2 winners:  (Nick Poloniato & Timothy Randall)
 Four-man bobsleigh winners:  (2 times)
 Women's bobsleigh winners:  (Alysia Rissling & Genevieve Thibault) (2 times)
 Skeleton #1 winners:  Katsuyuki Miyajima (m) /  Mirela Rahneva (f)
 Skeleton #2 winners:  Egor Veselov (m) /  Kimberley Bos (f)
 January 1 – 12: IBSF North American Cup #3 in  Park City
 Two-man bobsleigh #1 winners:  (Taylor Austin & Lascelles Brown)
 Two-man bobsleigh #2 winners:  (Nick Cunningham & Ryan Bailey)
 Four-man bobsleigh winners:  (#1) /  (#2)
 Women's bobsleigh #1 winners:  (LEE Seon-hye & SHIN Mi-ran)
 Women's bobsleigh #2 winners:  (KIM Yoo-ran & KIM Min-seong)
 Skeleton winners:  John Daly (m; 2 times) /  Madelaine Smith (f; 2 times)
 January 15 – 27: IBSF North American Cup #4 (final) in  Lake Placid, New York
 Two-man bobsleigh #1 winners:  (Nick Cunningham & Nathan Gilsleider)
 Two-man bobsleigh #2 winners:  (Nick Cunningham & Hakeem Abdul-Saboor)
 Four-man bobsleigh winners:  (#1) /  (#2)
 Women's bobsleigh #1 winners:  (KIM Yoo-ran & KIM Min-seong)
 Women's bobsleigh #2 winners:  (Nicole Vogt & Bonnie Kilis)
 Skeleton #1 winners:  Pavel Kulikov (m) /  Donna Creighton (f)
 Skeleton #2 winners:  John Daly (m) /  MUN Ra-young (f)

Curling

2016–17 International curling championships
 October 14 – 22, 2016: 2016 World Mixed Curling Championship in  Kazan
  (Skip: Alexander Krushelnitskiy) defeated  (Skip: Kristian Lindström), 5–4, to win Russia's first World Mixed Curling Championship title. 
  (Skip: Cameron Bryce) took the bronze medal.
 November 5 – 12, 2016: 2016 Pacific-Asia Curling Championships in  Uiseong
 Men:  (Skip: Yusuke Morozumi) defeated  (Skip: Liu Rui), 5–3, to win Japan's third Men's Pacific-Asia Curling Championships title.
  (Skip: Kim Soo-hyuk) took the bronze medal.
 Women:  (Skip: Kim Eun-jung) defeated  (Skip: Wang Bingyu), 5–3, to win South Korea's fourth Women's Pacific-Asia Curling Championships title.
  (Skip: Satsuki Fujisawa) took the bronze medal.
 November 19 – 26, 2016: 2016 European Curling Championships in  Renfrewshire (Braehead)
 Men:  (Skip: Niklas Edin) defeated  (Skip: Thomas Ulsrud), 6–5, to win Sweden's third consecutive and tenth overall Men's European Curling Championships title.
  (Skip: Peter de Cruz) took the bronze medal.
 Women:  (Skip: Victoria Moiseeva) defeated  (Skip: Anna Hasselborg), 6–4, to win Russia's second consecutive and fourth overall Women's European Curling Championships title.
  (Skip: Eve Muirhead) took the bronze medal.
 February 16 – 26: 2017 World Junior Curling Championships in  Pyeongchang
 Men:  (Skip: Lee Ki-jeong) defeated  (Skip: Andrew Stopera), 5–4, to win South Korea's first Men's World Junior Curling Championships title.
 (Skip: Magnus Ramsfjell) took the bronze medal.
 Women:  (Skip: Isabella Wranå) defeated  (Skip: Sophie Jackson), 10–7, to win Sweden's fourth Women's World Junior Curling Championships title.
 (Skip: Kristen Streifel) took the bronze medal.
 March 4 – 11: 2017 World Wheelchair Curling Championship in  Pyeongchang
 Mixed:  (Skip: Rune Lorentsen) defeated  (Skip: Andrey Smirnov), 8–3, to win Norway's third World Wheelchair Curling Championship title.
  (Skip: Aileen Neilson) took the bronze medal.
 March 18 – 26: 2017 World Women's Curling Championship in  Beijing
 (Skip: Rachel Homan) defeated  (Skip: Anna Sidorova), 8–3, to win Canada's 16th World Women's Curling Championship title.
 Note: Canada became the first women's team to be undefeated throughout this tournament.
 (Skip: Eve Muirhead) took the bronze medal.
 April 1 – 9: 2017 Ford World Men's Curling Championship in  Edmonton
 (Skip: Brad Gushue) defeated  (Skip: Niklas Edin), 4–2, to win Canada's 36th World Men's Curling Championship title.
 (Skip: Peter de Cruz) took the bronze medal.
 April 22 – 29: 2017 World Mixed Doubles and World Senior Curling Championships in  Lethbridge
 Mixed Doubles:  (Martin Rios & Jenny Perret) defeated  (Reid Carruthers & Joanne Courtney), 6–5, to win Switzerland's sixth World Mixed Doubles Curling Championship title.
 (Ba Dexin & Wang Rui) took the bronze medal.
 Men's Seniors:  (Skip: Mats Wrana) defeated  (Skip: Bryan Cochrane), 5–4, to win Sweden's second consecutive Men's World Senior Curling Championships title.
  (Skip: Peter Wilson) took the bronze medal.
 Women's Seniors:  (Skip: Colleen Jones) defeated  (Skip: Cristina Lestander), 10–5, to win Canada's 11th Women's World Senior Curling Championships title.
  (Skip: Jackie Lockhart) took the bronze medal.
 December 5 – 10: 2018 Winter Olympics Qualification Curling Tournament in  Plzeň

2016–17 Curling Canada season of champions
 November 30 – December 4, 2016: 2016 Canada Cup of Curling in  Brandon
 Men:  Reid Carruthers (skip) defeated  Brad Gushue (skip), 8–6, to win his first Men's Canada Cup of Curling title.
 Women:  Jennifer Jones (skip) defeated  Rachel Homan (skip), 9–5, to win her third Women's Canada Cup of Curling title.
 January 12 – 15: 2017 Continental Cup of Curling in  Las Vegas
 / Team North America defeated  Team World, 37–23, in points.
 January 21 – 29: 2017 Canadian Junior Curling Championships in  Victoria, British Columbia
 Men:  Tyler Tardi (skip) defeated  Matthew Hall (skip), 9–7, to win BC's fifth Canadian Junior Curling Championships title.
 Women:  Kristen Streifel (skip) defeated  Hailey Armstrong (skip), 5–3, to win Alberta's ninth Women's Canadian Junior Curling Championships title.
 February 18 – 26: 2017 Scotties Tournament of Hearts in  St. Catharines
  Rachel Homan (skip) defeated  Michelle Englot (skip), 8–6, to win her third Scotties Tournament of Hearts title.
 March 4 – 12: 2017 Tim Hortons Brier in  St. John's
  Brad Gushue (skip) defeated  Kevin Koe (skip), 7–6, to win his first Tim Hortons Brier title.

2016–17 World Curling Tour and Grand Slam of Curling
 October 25, 2016 – 2017: 2016–17 World Curling Tour and Grand Slam of Curling Schedules
 October 25 – 30, 2016: 2016 The Masters Grand Slam of Curling in  Okotoks
 Men:  Team Edin (Skip: Niklas Edin) defeated  Team Jacobs (Skip: Brad Jacobs), 5–4, in the final.
 Women:  Team Flaxey (Skip: Allison Flaxey) defeated  Team Homan (Skip: Rachel Homan), 6–3, in the final.
 November 8 – 13, 2016: 2016 GSOC Tour Challenge in  Cranbrook
 Men:  Niklas Edin (skip) defeated  Kyle Smith (skip), 7–3, to win his first Men's GSOC Tour Challenge title.
 Women:  Valerie Sweeting (skip) defeated  Michelle Englot (skip), 8–4, to win her first Women's GSOC Tour Challenge title.
 December 6 – 11, 2016: 2016 Boost National in  Sault Ste. Marie
 Men:  Brad Jacobs (skip) defeated  Reid Carruthers (skip), 4–2, to win his first Men's The National title.
 Women:  Kerri Einarson (skip) defeated  Silvana Tirinzoni (skip), 5–3, to win her first Women's The National title.
 January 3 – 8: 2017 Meridian Canadian Open in  North Battleford
 Men:  Brad Gushue (skip) defeated  Niklas Edin (skip), 8–3, to win his second Men's Meridian Canadian Open title. 
 Women:  Casey Scheidegger (skip) defeated  Silvana Tirinzoni (skip), 5–4, to win her first Women's Meridian Canadian Open title. 
 March 16 – 19: 2017 Elite 10 in  Port Hawkesbury
  John Morris (skip) defeated  Brad Jacobs (skip), 3–2, to win his first Elite 10 title. 
 April 11 – 16: 2017 Players' Championship in  Toronto
 Men:  Niklas Edin (skip) defeated  Mike McEwen (skip), 5–3, to win his first Players' Championship title.
 Note: Niklas' team was the first non-Canadian team to win this curling tournament.
 Women:  Jennifer Jones (skip) defeated  Valerie Sweeting (skip), 8–4, to win her sixth Players' Championship title.
 April 25 – 30: 2017 Humpty's Champions Cup in  Calgary
 Men:  Brad Jacobs (skip) defeated  Kevin Koe (skip), 6–2, to win his first Humpty's Champions Cup title.
 Women:  Rachel Homan (skip) defeated  Anna Hasselborg (skip), 5–4, to win her first Humpty's Champions Cup title.

Figure skating

International figure skating events
 January 25 – 29: 2017 European Figure Skating Championships in  Ostrava
 Men's winner:  Javier Fernández
 Ladies' winner:  Evgenia Medvedeva
 Pairs winners:  (Evgenia Tarasova & Vladimir Morozov)
 Ice dance winners:  (Gabriella Papadakis & Guillaume Cizeron)
 February 14 – 19: 2017 Four Continents Figure Skating Championships in  Gangneung
 Men's winner:  Nathan Chen
 Ladies' winner:  Mai Mihara
 Pairs winners:  (Sui Wenjing & Han Cong)
 Ice dance winners:  (Tessa Virtue & Scott Moir)
 March 15 – 19: 2017 World Junior Figure Skating Championships in  Taipei
 Junior Men's winner:  Vincent Zhou
 Junior Ladies' winner:  Alina Zagitova
 Junior Pairs winners:  (Ekaterina Alexandrovskaya & Harley Windsor)
 Junior Ice dance winners: The  (Rachel Parsons & Michael Parsons)
 March 29 – April 2: 2017 World Figure Skating Championships in  Helsinki
 Men's winner:  Yuzuru Hanyu
 Ladies' winner:  Evgenia Medvedeva
 Pairs winners:  (Sui Wenjing & Han Cong)
 Ice dance winners:  (Tessa Virtue & Scott Moir)
 April 20 – 23: 2017 ISU World Team Trophy in Figure Skating in  Tokyo
 Champions: ; Second: ; Third: The

2016–17 ISU Grand Prix of Figure Skating
 October 21 – 23: 2016 Skate America in  Chicago
 Men's winner:  Shoma Uno
 Ladies' winner:  Ashley Wagner
 Pairs winners:  (Julianne Séguin & Charlie Bilodeau)
 Ice dance winners:  (Maia Shibutani & Alex Shibutani)
 October 28 – 30: 2016 Skate Canada International in  Mississauga
 Men's winner:  Patrick Chan
 Ladies' winner:  Evgenia Medvedeva
 Pairs winners:  (Meagan Duhamel & Eric Radford)
 Ice dance winners:  (Tessa Virtue & Scott Moir)
 November 4 – 6: 2016 Rostelecom Cup in  Moscow
 Men's winner:  Javier Fernández
 Ladies' winner:  Anna Pogorilaya
 Pairs winners:  (Aliona Savchenko & Bruno Massot)
 Ice dance winners:  (Ekaterina Bobrova & Dmitri Soloviev)
 November 11 – 13: 2016 Trophée de France in  Paris
 Men's winner:  Javier Fernández
 Ladies' winner:  Evgenia Medvedeva
 Pairs winners:  (Aliona Savchenko & Bruno Massot)
 Ice dance winners:  (Gabriella Papadakis & Guillaume Cizeron)
 November 18 – 20: 2016 Cup of China in  Beijing
 Men's winner:  Patrick Chan
 Ladies' winner:  Elena Radionova
 Pairs winners:  (Yu Xiaoyu & Zhang Hao)
 Ice dance winners:  (Maia Shibutani & Alex Shibutani)
 November 25 – 27: 2016 NHK Trophy in  Sapporo
 Men's winner:  Yuzuru Hanyu
 Ladies' winner:  Anna Pogorilaya
 Pairs winners:  (Meagan Duhamel & Eric Radford)
 Ice dance winners:  (Tessa Virtue & Scott Moir)
 December 8 – 11: 2016–17 Grand Prix of Figure Skating Final in  Marseille
 Men's winner:  Yuzuru Hanyu
 Ladies' winner:  Evgenia Medvedeva
 Pairs winners:  (Evgenia Tarasova & Vladimir Morozov)
 Ice dance winners:  (Tessa Virtue & Scott Moir)

2016–17 ISU Junior Grand Prix
 August 24 – 28: 2016 ISU Junior Grand Prix in France in  Saint-Gervais-les-Bains
 Junior Men winner:  Roman Savosin
 Junior Ladies winner:  Alina Zagitova
 Junior Ice Dance winners:  (Angélique Abachkina & Louis Thauron)
 August 31 – September 4: 2016 ISU Junior Grand Prix in the Czech Republic in  Ostrava
 Junior Men winner:  Dmitri Aliev
 Junior Ladies winner:  Anastasiia Gubanova
 Junior Pairs winners:  (Anna Dušková & Martin Bidař)
 Junior Ice Dance winners:  (Lorraine McNamara & Quinn Carpenter)
 September 7 – 11: 2016 ISU Junior Grand Prix in Japan in  Yokohama
 Junior Men winner:  Cha Jun-hwan
 Junior Ladies winner:  Kaori Sakamoto
 Junior Ice Dance winners:  (Rachel Parsons & Michael Parsons)
 September 14 – 18: 2016 ISU Junior Grand Prix in Russia in  Saransk
 Junior Men winner:  Alexander Samarin
 Junior Ladies winner:  Elizaveta Nugumanova
 Junior Pairs winners:  (Anastasia Mishina & Vladislav Mirzoev)
 Junior Ice Dance winners:  (Alla Loboda & Pavel Drozd)
 September 21 – 25: 2016 ISU Junior Grand Prix in Slovenia in  Ljubljana
 Junior Men winner:  Alexei Krasnozhon
 Junior Ladies winner:  Rika Kihira
 Junior Ice Dance winners:  (Lorraine McNamara & Quinn Carpenter)
 September 28 – October 2: 2016 ISU Junior Grand Prix in Estonia in  Tallinn
 Junior Men winner:  Alexander Samarin
 Junior Ladies winner:  Polina Tsurskaya
 Junior Pairs winners:  (Ekaterina Alexandrovskaya & Harley Windsor)
 Junior Ice Dance winners:  (Alla Loboda & Pavel Drozd)
 October 5 – 9: 2016 ISU Junior Grand Prix in Germany in  Dresden
 Junior Men winner:  Cha Jun-hwan
 Junior Ladies winner:  Anastasiia Gubanova
 Junior Pairs winners:  (Anastasia Mishina & Vladislav Mirzoev)
 Junior Ice Dance winners:  (Rachel Parsons & Michael Parsons)
 December 8 – 11: 2016–17 Grand Prix of Figure Skating Final in  Marseille
 Junior Men winner:  Dmitri Aliev
 Junior Ladies winner:  Alina Zagitova
 Junior Pairs winners:  (Anastasia Mishina & Vladislav Mirzoev)
 Junior Ice Dance winners:  (Rachel Parsons & Michael Parsons)

Ice hockey

World ice hockey championships
 December 26, 2016 – January 5, 2017: 2017 World Junior Ice Hockey Championships in  Toronto and Montreal
 The  defeated , 5–4 in a shootout, to win their fourth World Junior Ice Hockey Championships title.
  took the bronze medal.
 January 7 – 14: 2017 IIHF World Women's U18 Championship in  Přerov and Zlín
 The  defeated , 3–1, to win their third consecutive and sixth overall IIHF World Women's U18 Championship title.
  took the bronze medal.
 March 31 – April 7: 2017 IIHF Women's World Championship in  Plymouth Township, Michigan
 The  defeated , 3–2 in overtime, to win their fourth consecutive and eighth overall IIHF Women's World Championship title. 
  took the bronze medal.
 April 13 – 23: 2017 IIHF World U18 Championships in  Poprad and Spišská Nová Ves
 The  defeated , 4–2, to win their tenth IIHF World U18 Championships title.
  took the bronze medal.
 May 5 – 21: 2017 IIHF World Championship co-hosted in both  Paris and  Cologne
  defeated , 2–1 in a shootout and after a 1–1 score in regular play, to win their tenth IIHF World Championship title.
  took the bronze medal.

National Hockey League
 October 12, 2016 – April 9, 2017: 2016–17 NHL season
 Presidents' Trophy winner:  Washington Capitals
 Regular season scoring winner:  Connor McDavid ( Edmonton Oilers)
 Regular season leading goaltenders winner:  Sergei Bobrovsky ( Columbus Blue Jackets)
 January 1: NHL Centennial Classic at BMO Field in  Toronto
 The  Toronto Maple Leafs defeated the  Detroit Red Wings, 5–4, in overtime.
 January 2: 2017 NHL Winter Classic at Busch Stadium in  St. Louis
 The  St. Louis Blues defeated the  Chicago Blackhawks, 4–1.
 January 28 & 29: 62nd National Hockey League All-Star Game at Staples Center in  Los Angeles
 Gatorade NHL Skills Challenge Relay winners: Metropolitan Division
 Honda NHL Four Line Challenge winners: Pacific Division
 DraftKings NHL Accuracy Shooting winners: Metropolitan & Pacific Divisions
 Individual AS winner:  Sidney Crosby ( Pittsburgh Penguins)
 Bridgestone NHL Fastest Skater winners: Pacific & Atlantic Divisions
 Individual FS winner:  Connor McDavid ( Edmonton Oilers)
 Oscar Mayer NHL Hardest Shot winners: Atlantic Division
 Individual HS winner:  Shea Weber ( Montreal Canadiens)
 Discover NHL Shootout winners: Atlantic Division
 All-Star Game: The Metropolitan Division defeated the Pacific Division, 4–3.
 MVP:  Wayne Simmonds ( Philadelphia Flyers)
 February 25: 2017 NHL Stadium Series at Heinz Field in  Pittsburgh
 The  Pittsburgh Penguins defeated the  Philadelphia Flyers, 4–2.
 April 12 – June 11: 2017 Stanley Cup playoffs
 The  Pittsburgh Penguins defeated the  Nashville Predators, 4–2 in games won, to win their second consecutive and fifth overall Stanley Cup title.
 Conn Smythe Trophy winner:  Sidney Crosby (Pittsburgh Penguins)
 June 23 & 24: 2017 NHL Entry Draft at the United Center in  Chicago
 #1 pick:  Nico Hischier (to the  New Jersey Devils from the  Halifax Mooseheads)
 October 4, 2017 – April 7, 2018: 2017–18 NHL season
 December 16: NHL 100 Classic at TD Place Stadium in  Ottawa
 The  Ottawa Senators defeated the  Montreal Canadiens, 3–0.

Kontinental Hockey League
 August 22, 2016 – April 16, 2017: 2016–17 KHL season
  SKA defeated fellow Russian team, Metallurg Magnitogorsk, 4–1 in games played, to win their second Gagarin Cup title.

Champions Hockey League
 August 16, 2016 – February 7, 2017: 2016–17 Champions Hockey League
  Frölunda HC defeated  HC Sparta Praha, 4–3, to win their second consecutive Champions Hockey League title.

Asia League Ice Hockey
 August 27, 2016 – April 11, 2017: 2016–17 Asia League Ice Hockey
  Anyang Halla defeated  PSK Sakhalin, 3–0 in games played, to win their third consecutive and fifth overall Asia League Ice Hockey title.

IIHF Continental Cup
 September 30, 2016 – January 15, 2017: 2016–17 IIHF Continental Cup
 Winner:  Nottingham Panthers (promoted to the 2017–18 Champions Hockey League)

Clarkson Cup
 March 5, 2017: 2017 Clarkson Cup in  Ottawa, Ontario
 The  Les Canadiennes de Montreal defeated the  Calgary Inferno 3–1 to win their first Clarkson Cup title.

NWHL
 March 19, 2016: 2017 Isobel Cup in  Lowell, Massachusetts, at the Tsongas Center.
 The  Buffalo Beauts defeated the  Boston Pride 3–2 to win the second Isobel Cup.

Memorial Cup
 May 19 – 28, 2017: 2017 Memorial Cup in  Windsor, Ontario
 The  Windsor Spitfires defeated the  Erie Otters, 4–3, to win their third Memorial Cup title.

Allan Cup
 April 10 – 15: 2017 Allan Cup in  Bouctouche
  Grand Falls-Windsor Cataracts defeated  Lacombe Generals, 7–4, to win their first Allan Cup title.

Luge

International luge events
 December 4, 2016: 2016 Junior America-Pacific Luge Championships in  Calgary
 Junior Women's Singles:  Brittney Arndt
 December 16 & 17, 2016: 2016 America-Pacific Luge Championships in  Park City, Utah
 Singles:  Tucker West (m) /  Erin Hamlin (f)
 Men's Doubles:  (Matthew Mortensen & Jayson Terdiman)
 December 22 & 23, 2016: 2016 Asian Luge Championships in  Nagano
 Men's Singles:  Shiva Keshavan
 January 5 & 6: FIL European Luge Championships 2017 in  Schönau am Königsee
 Singles:  Semen Pavlichenko (m) /  Natalie Geisenberger (f)
 Men's Doubles:  (Tobias Wendl & Tobias Arlt)
 Mixed Team Relay:  (Natalie Geisenberger, Ralf Palik, Tobias Wendl & Tobias Arlt)
 January 21 & 22: 2017 FIL Junior European Luge Championships in  Oberhof
 Junior Singles:  Max Langenhan (m) /  Jessica Tiebel (f)
 Junior Men's Doubles:  (Hannes Orlamünder & Paul Gubitz)
 January 27 – 29: FIL World Luge Championships 2017 in  Innsbruck
 Singles:  Wolfgang Kindl (m) /  Tatjana Hüfner (f)
 Men's Doubles:  (Toni Eggert & Sascha Benecken)
 Sprint:  Wolfgang Kindl (m) /  Erin Hamlin (f)
 Men's Sprint Doubles:  (Tobias Wendl & Tobias Arlt)
 U23:  Roman Repilov (m) /  Summer Britcher (f)
 Men's U23 Doubles:  (Thomas Steu & Lorenz Koller)
 February 2 – 5: 2017 FIL World Luge Natural Track Championships in  Vatra Dornei
 Singles:  Alex Gruber (m) /  Greta Pinggera (f)
 Men's Doubles:  (Rupert Brueggler & Tobias Angerer)
 February 4 & 5: 2017 FIL Junior World Luge Championships in  Sigulda
 Junior Singles:  Kristers Aparjods (m) /  Jessica Tiebel (f)
 Junior Men's Doubles:  (Hannes Orlamunder & Paul Gubitz)
 February 11 & 12: 2017 FIL Junior European Luge Natural Track Championships in  Umhausen
 Junior Singles:  Fabian Achenrainer (m) /  Alexandra Pfattner (f)
 Junior Men's Doubles:  (Manuel Gaio & Nicolo Debertolis)

2016–17 Luge World Cup
 November 26 & 27, 2016: #1 in  Winterberg
 Singles:  Johannes Ludwig (m) /  Natalie Geisenberger (f)
 Men's Doubles:  (Toni Eggert & Sascha Benecken)
 December 2 & 3, 2016: #2 in  Lake Placid, New York
 Singles:  Tucker West (m) /  Tatjana Hüfner (f)
 Men's Doubles:  (Toni Eggert & Sascha Benecken)
 December 9 & 10, 2016: #3 in  Whistler, British Columbia
 Singles:  Tucker West (m) /  Alex Gough (f)
 Men's Doubles:  (Toni Eggert & Sascha Benecken)
 December 16 & 17, 2016: #4 in  Park City, Utah
 Singles:  Roman Repilov (m) /   Erin Hamlin (f)
 Men's Doubles:  (Tobias Wendl & Tobias Arlt)
 January 5 & 6: #5 in  Schönau am Königsee
 Singles:  Semen Pavlichenko (m) /  Natalie Geisenberger (f)
 Men's Doubles:  (Tobias Wendl & Tobias Arlt)
 January 14 & 15: #6 in  Sigulda
 Singles:  Semen Pavlichenko (m) /  Natalie Geisenberger (f)
 Men's Doubles:  (Toni Eggert & Sascha Benecken)
 February 4 & 5: #7 in  Oberhof
 Singles:  Felix Loch (m) /  Natalie Geisenberger (f)
 Men's Doubles:  (Tobias Wendl & Tobias Arlt)
 February 18 & 19: #8 in  Pyeongchang
 Singles:  Dominik Fischnaller (m) /  Tatiana Ivanova (f)
 Men's Doubles:  (Toni Eggert & Sascha Benecken)
 February 25 & 26: #9 (final) in  Altenberg, Saxony
 Singles:  Roman Repilov (m) /  Natalie Geisenberger (f)
 Men's Doubles:  (Toni Eggert & Sascha Benecken)

2016–17 Team Relay Luge World Cup
 December 2 & 3, 2016: #1 in  Lake Placid, New York
 Winners:  (Kimberley McRae, Samuel Edney, Tristan Walker & Justin Snith)
 December 10, 2016: #2 in  Whistler, British Columbia
 Event cancelled, due to unfavorable weather delays.
 January 5 & 6: #3 in  Schönau am Königsee
 Winners:  (Natalie Geisenberger, Ralf Palik, Tobias Wendl & Tobias Arlt)
 January 14 & 15: #4 in  Sigulda
 Winners:  (Tatiana Ivanova, Semen Pavlichenko, Vladislav Yuzhakov & Iurii Prokhorov)
 February 4 & 5: #5 in  Oberhof
 Winners:  (Natalie Geisenberger, Felix Loch, Tobias Wendl & Tobias Arlt)
 February 18 & 19: #6 in  Pyeongchang
 Winners:  (Natalie Geisenberger, Andi Langenhan, Toni Eggert & Sascha Benecken)
 February 26: #7 (final) in  Altenberg
 Winners:  (Natalie Geisenberger, Felix Loch, Toni Eggert & Sascha Benecken)

2016–17 Sprint Luge World Cup
 November 26 & 27, 2016: #1 in  Winterberg
 Singles:  Felix Loch (m) /  Dajana Eitberger (f)
 Men's Doubles:  (Toni Eggert & Sascha Benecken)
 December 16 & 17, 2016: #2 in  Park City, Utah
 Singles:  Dominik Fischnaller (m) /  Erin Hamlin (f)
 Men's Doubles:  (Toni Eggert & Sascha Benecken)
 January 14 & 15: #3 (final) in  Sigulda
 Singles:  Roman Repilov (m) /  Tatiana Ivanova (f)
 Men's Doubles:  (Toni Eggert & Sascha Benecken)

2016–17 FIL World Cup – Natural Track
 December 9 – 11, 2016: WCNT #1 in  Kühtai
 Singles:  Patrick Pigneter (m) /  Tina Unterberger (f)
 Men's Doubles:  (Patrick Pigneter & Florian Clara)
 January 6 – 8, 2017: WCNT #2 in  Latsch
 Singles:  Patrick Pigneter (m) /  Evelin Lanthaler (f)
 Men's Doubles:  (Rupert Brueggler & Tobias Angerer)
 January 12 – 15: WCNT #3 in  Moscow
 Singles:  Thomas Kammerlander (m) /  Evelin Lanthaler (f)
 Men's Doubles:  (Pavel Porshnev & Ivan Lazarev)
 January 20 – 22: WCNT #4 in  Železniki
 Singles:  Patrick Pigneter (m) /  Greta Pinggera (f)
 Men's Doubles:  (Patrick Pigneter & Florian Clara)
 January 27 – 29: WCNT #5 in  Deutschnofen
 Singles:  Alex Gruber (m) /  Greta Pinggera (f)
 Men's Doubles:  (Pavel Porshnev & Ivan Lazarev)
 February 16 – 18: WCNT #6 (final) in  Umhausen
 Singles:  Thomas Kammerlander (m) /  Greta Pinggera (f)
 Men's Doubles:  (Pavel Porshnev & Ivan Lazarev)

Speed skating

2016–17 ISU Speed Skating World Cup
 November 11–13, 2016: ISU LTSS World Cup #1 in  Harbin
 500 m #1 winners:  Roman Krech (m) /  Nao Kodaira (f)
 500 m #2 winners:  Pavel Kulizhnikov (m) /  Nao Kodaira (f)
 1000 m winners:  Kjeld Nuis (m) /  Heather Richardson-Bergsma (f)
 1500 m winners:  Sven Kramer (m) /  Heather Richardson-Bergsma (f)
 Women's 3000 m winner:  Martina Sáblíková
 Men's 5000 m winner:  Sven Kramer
 Men's Team Pursuit winners: The  (Sven Kramer, Douwe de Vries, Patrick Roest, & Jorrit Bergsma)
 Women's Team Pursuit winners: The  (Ireen Wüst, Marrit Leenstra, Antoinette de Jong, & Marije Joling)
 Mass start winners:  Lee Seung-hoon (m) /  Ivanie Blondin (f)
 November 18–20, 2016: ISU LTSS World Cup #2 in  Nagano
 500 m winners:  Nico Ihle (m) /  Nao Kodaira (f)
 1000 m winners:  Kjeld Nuis (m) /  Heather Richardson-Bergsma (f)
 1500 m winners:  Joey Mantia (m) /  Heather Richardson-Bergsma (f)
 Men's 5000 m winner:  Sven Kramer
 Women's 3000 m winner:  Martina Sáblíková
 Men's Team Pursuit winners: The  (Sven Kramer, Jorrit Bergsma, Douwe de Vries, & Patrick Roest)
 Women's Team Pursuit winners: The  (Marrit Leenstra, Antoinette de Jong, Marije Joling, & Ireen Wüst)
 Men's Team Sprint winners:  (Laurent Dubreuil, Christopher Fiola, Vincent De Haître, & Alexandre St-Jean)
 Women's Team Sprint winners:  (Erina Kamiya, Arisa Go, Maki Tsuji, & Saori Toi)
 Mass start winners:  Jorrit Bergsma (m) /  Kim Bo-reum (f)
 December 2–4, 2016: ISU LTSS World Cup #3 in  Astana
 500 m #1 winners:  Dai Dai Ntab (m) /  Yu Jing (f)
 500 m #2 winners:  Ruslan Murashov (m) /  Yu Jing (f)
 1000 m winners:  Vincent De Haître (m) /  Miho Takagi (f)
 1500 m winners:  Denis Yuskov (m) /  Miho Takagi (f)
 Men's 5000 m winner:  Peter Michael
 Women's 3000 m winner:  Martina Sáblíková
 Men's Team Pursuit winners:  (Shota Nakamura, Ryosuke Tsuchiya, & Shane Williamson)
 Women's Team Pursuit winners:  (Miho Takagi, Misaki Oshigiri, Nana Takagi, & Ayano Sato)
 Mass start winners:  Andrea Giovannini (m) /  Ivanie Blondin (f)
 December 9–11, 2016: ISU LTSS World Cup #4 in  Heerenveen
 500 m winners:  Ruslan Murashov (m) /  Nao Kodaira (f)
 1000 m winners:  Kjeld Nuis (m) /  Heather Richardson-Bergsma (f)
 1500 m winners:  Kjeld Nuis (m) /  Ireen Wüst (f)
 Men's 10,000 m winner:  Jorrit Bergsma
 Women's 5000 m winner:  Martina Sáblíková
 Men's Team Pursuit winners:  (Sverre Lunde Pedersen, Simen Spieler Nilsen, Sindre Henriksen, & Håvard Holmefjord Lorentzen)
 Women's Team Pursuit winners:  (Miho Takagi, Ayano Sato, & Nana Takagi)
 Men's Team Sprint winners: The  (Kimani Griffin, Jonathan Garcia, Mitchell Whitmore, & Brian Hansen)
 Women's Team Sprint winners:  (Arisa Go, Maki Tsuji, & Nao Kodaira)
 Mass start winners:  Joey Mantia (m) /  Kim Bo-reum (f)
 January 27–29, 2017: ISU LTSS World Cup #5 in  Berlin
 500 m #1 winners:  Nico Ihle (m) /  Nao Kodaira (f)
 500 m #2 winners:  Ruslan Murashov (m) /  Nao Kodaira (f)
 Men's 1000 m winners:  Kjeld Nuis (#1) /  Kai Verbij (#2)
 Women's 1000 m winner:  Heather Richardson-Bergsma (2 times)
 1500 m winners:  Kjeld Nuis (m) /  Ireen Wüst (f)
 Men's 5000 m winner:  Ted-Jan Bloemen
 Women's 3000 m winner:  Ireen Wüst
 March 10–12, 2017: ISU LTSS World Cup #6 (final) in  Stavanger
 Note: The ISU removed Chelyabinsk from hosting it, due to the McLaren Report.
 500 m winners:  Dai Dai Ntab (m; 2 times) /  Nao Kodaira (f; 2 times)
 1000 m winners:  Kjeld Nuis (m) /  Heather Richardson-Bergsma (f)
 1500 m winners:  Kjeld Nuis (m) /  Heather Richardson-Bergsma (f)
 Men's 5000 m winner:  Jorrit Bergsma
 Women's 3000 m winner:  Martina Sáblíková
 Men's Team Pursuit winners: The  (Jorrit Bergsma, Douwe de Vries, Evert Hoolwerf, & Arjan Stroetinga)
 Women's Team Pursuit winners:  (Misaki Oshigiri, Miho Takagi, Nana Takagi, & Ayano Sato)
 Men's Team Sprint winners: The  (Jan Smeekens, Ronald Mulder, Kai Verbij, & Pim Schipper)
 Women's Team Sprint winners: The  (Floor van den Brandt, Anice Das, Marrit Leenstra, & Sanneke de Neeling)
 Mass Start winners:  Lee Seung-hoon (m) /  Irene Schouten (f)

Other long track speed skating events
 January 6–8, 2017: 2017 European Speed Skating Championships in  HeerenveenISU's European Sprint Speed Skating Championships 2017 Results Page
 Note: This event was scheduled for Warsaw, but cancelled, due to major problems at that city's venue.''
 Allround winners:  Sven Kramer (m) /  Ireen Wüst (f)
 Sprint winners:  Kai Verbij (m) /  Karolína Erbanová (f)
 February 9–12, 2017: 2017 World Single Distance Speed Skating Championships in  Gangneung
 500 m winners:  Jan Smeekens (m) /  Nao Kodaira (f)
 1000 m winners:  Kjeld Nuis (m) /  Heather Richardson-Bergsma (f)
 1500 m winners:  Kjeld Nuis (m) /  Heather Richardson-Bergsma (f)
 5000 m winners:  Sven Kramer (m) /  Martina Sáblíková (f)
 Men's 10000 m winner:  Sven Kramer
 Women's 3000 m winner:  Ireen Wüst
 Men's Team Pursuit winners: The  (Jorrit Bergsma, Jan Blokhuijsen, Douwe de Vries, & Patrick Roest)
 Women's Team Pursuit winners: The  (Ireen Wüst, Marrit Leenstra, Antoinette de Jong, & Annouk van der Weijden)
 Mass Start winners:  Joey Mantia (m) /  Kim Bo-reum (f)
 February 17–19, 2017: 2017 World Junior Speed Skating Championships in  Helsinki
 500 m winners:  Koki Kubo (m) /  Daria Kachanova (f)
 1000 m winners:  Allan Dahl Johansson (m) /  Daria Kachanova (f)
 1500 m winners:  Allan Dahl Johansson (m) /  Jutta Leerdam (f)
 Men's 5000 m winner:  Chris Huizinga
 Women's 3000 m winner:  Joy Beune
 Men's Team Pursuit winners:  (Riki Hayashi, Riku Tsuchiya, & Aoi Yokoyama)
 Women's Team Pursuit winners: The  (Joy Beune, Elisa Dul, Sanne In't Hof, & Jutta Leerdam)
 Men's Team Sprint winners: The  (Niek Deelstra, Thijs Govers, & Tijmen Snel)
 Women's Team Sprint winners:  (LI Huawei, YANG Sining, SUN Nan, & XI Dongxue)
 Mass Start winners:  Chris Huizinga (m) /  Elisa Dul (f)
 February 25 & 26, 2017: 2017 World Sprint Speed Skating Championships in  Calgary
 Men's 500 m winner:  Ronald Mulder (2 times)
 Men's 1000 m winner:  Kjeld Nuis (2 times)
 Women's 500 m winner:  Nao Kodaira (2 times)
 Women's 1000 m winners:  Nao Kodaira (#1) /  Heather Richardson-Bergsma (#2)
 March 4 & 5, 2017: 2017 World Allround Speed Skating Championships in  Hamar
 500 m winners:  Shota Nakamura (m) /  Miho Takagi (f)
 1500 m winners:  Denis Yuskov (m) /  Ireen Wüst (f)
 5000 m winners:  Sven Kramer (m) /  Martina Sáblíková (f)
 Men's 10,000 m winner:  Sven Kramer
 Women's 3000 m winner:  Martina Sáblíková

2016–17 ISU Short Track Speed Skating World Cup
 November 4–6, 2016: ISU STSS World Cup #1 in  Calgary
 500 m #1 winners:  Samuel Girard (m) /  Fan Kexin (f)
 500 m #2 winners:  Sándor Liu Shaolin (m) /  Elise Christie (f)
 1000 m winners:  Charle Cournoyer (m) /  Choi Min-jeong (f)
 1500 m winners:  Sjinkie Knegt (m) /  Shim Suk-hee (f)
 Men's 5000 m Relay winners:  (Liu Shaoang, Sándor Liu Shaolin, Csaba Burján, Viktor Knoch)
 Women's 3000 m Relay winners:  (Shim Suk-hee, Noh Do-hee, KIM Geon-hee, Choi Min-jeong)
 November 11–13, 2016: ISU STSS World Cup #2 in  Salt Lake City
 500 m winners:  Abzal Azhgaliyev (m) /  Marianne St-Gelais (f)
 1000 m winners:  LIM Kyoung-won (m) /  KIM Ji-yoo (f)
 1500 m #1 winners:  Samuel Girard (m) /  Choi Min-jeong (f)
 1500 m #2 winners:  Sjinkie Knegt (m) /  Shim Suk-hee (f)
 Men's 5000 m Relay winners:  (Wu Dajing, XU Hongzhi, Han Tianyu, & Ren Ziwei)
 Women's 3000 m Relay winners:  (Noh Do-hee, Shim Suk-hee, Choi Min-jeong, & KIM Ji-yoo)
 December 9–11, 2016: ISU STSS World Cup #3 in  Shanghai
 500 m #1 winners:  Wu Dajing (m) /  Elise Christie (f)
 500 m #2 winners:  Wu Dajing (m) /  Elise Christie (f)
 1000 m winners:  Liu Shaoang (m) /  Choi Min-jeong (f)
 1500 m winners:  Lee Jung-su (m) /  Shim Suk-hee (f)
 Men's 5000 m Relay winners:  (Wu Dajing, XU Hongzhi, Han Tianyu, & Ren Ziwei)
 Women's 3000 m Relay winners:  (Noh Do-hee, Shim Suk-hee, Choi Min-jeong, & KIM Ji-yoo)
 December 16–18, 2016: ISU STSS World Cup #4 in  Gangneung
 500 m winners:  Wu Dajing (m) /  Choi Min-jeong (f)
 1000 m #1 winners:  Nurbergen Zhumagaziyev (m) /  Elise Christie (f)
 1000 m #2 winners:  Charles Hamelin (m) /  Elise Christie (f)
 1500 m winners:  Lee Jung-su (m) /  Shim Suk-hee (f)
 Men's 5000 m Relay winners:  (Viktor Knoch, Csaba Burján, Sándor Liu Shaolin, & Liu Shaoang)
 Women's 3000 m Relay winners:  (Noh Do-hee, Shim Suk-hee, Choi Min-jeong, & KIM Ji-yoo)
 February 3–5, 2017: ISU STSS World Cup #5 in  Dresden
 500 m winners:  Sándor Liu Shaolin (m) /  Marianne St-Gelais (f)
 1000 m winners:  Thibaut Fauconnet (m) /  Marianne St-Gelais (f)
 1500 m #1 winners:  Charles Hamelin (m) /  Kim Boutin (f)
 1500 m #2 winners:  Sjinkie Knegt (m) /  Suzanne Schulting (f)
 Men's 5000 m Relay winners:  (Semion Elistratov, Vladimir Grigorev, Viktor Ahn, & Alexander Shulginov)
 Women's 3000 m Relay winners: The  (Yara van Kerkhof, Lara van Ruijven, Rianne de Vries, & Suzanne Schulting) 
 February 10–12, 2017: ISU STSS World Cup #6 (final) in  Minsk
 500 m winners:  Denis Nikisha (m) /  KIM Ye-jin (f)
 1000 m #1 winners:  HWANG Dae-heon (m) /  LIU Yang (f)
 1000 m #2 winners:  LIM Yong-jin (m) /  Han Yutong (f)
 1500 m winners:  LEE Hyo-been (m) /  Noh Ah-reum (f)
 Men's 5000 m Relay winners: The  (Daan Breeuwsma, Sjinkie Knegt, Itzhak de Laat, & Dennis Visser)
 Women's 3000 m Relay winners:  (Tatiana Borodulina, Evgeniya Zakharova, Sofia Prosvirnova, & Ekaterina Konstantinova)

Other short track speed skating events
 January 13 – 15: 2017 European Short Track Speed Skating Championships in  Torino
 500 m winners:  Sjinkie Knegt (m) /  Rianne de Vries (f)
 1000 m winners:  Sándor Liu Shaolin (m) /  Sofia Prosvirnova (f)
 1500 m winners:  Semion Elistratov (m) /  Arianna Fontana (f)
 3000 m Superfinal winners:  Semion Elistratov (m) /  Arianna Fontana (f)
 Men's 5000 m relay winners: The  (Daan Breeuwsma, Sjinkie Knegt, Itzhak de Laat, & Dylan Hoogerwerf)
 Women's 3000 m relay winners:  (Arianna Fontana, Cecilia Maffei, Martina Valcepina, & Lucia Peretti)
 January 27 – 29: 2017 World Junior Short Track Speed Skating Championships in  Innsbruck
 500 m winners:  LIU Shaoang (m) /  LEE Yu-bin (f)
 1000 m winners:  LIU Shaoang (m) /  LEE Yu-bin (f)
 1500 m winners:  LIU Shaoang (m) /  SEO Whi-min (f)
 1500 m Superfinal winners:  KIM Si-un /  LEE Yu-bin (f)
 Men's 3000 m relay winners:  (KIM Si-un, MOON Won-jun, PARK Noh-won, & JUNG Hok-young)
 Women's 3000 m relay winners:  (GONG Li, LI Jinyu, SONG Yang, & LUO Linyun)
 March 10 – 12: 2017 World Short Track Speed Skating Championships in  Rotterdam
 500 m winners:  Sjinkie Knegt (m) /  Fan Kexin (f)
 1000 m winners:  SEO Yi-ra (m) /  Elise Christie (f)
 1500 m winners:  Sin Da-woon (m) /  Elise Christie (f)
 3000 m Superfinal winners:  Sjinkie Knegt (m) /  Shim Suk-hee (f)
 Men's 5000 m relay winners: The  (Daan Breeuwsma, Sjinkie Knegt, Itzhak de Laat, & Dennis Visser)
 Women's 3000 m relay winners:  (Fan Kexin, QU Chunyu, Guo Yihan, & ZANG Yize)

See also
 2017 in skiing
 2017 in sports

References

External links
 Federation of International Bandy
 The International Bobsleigh and Skeleton Federation
 World Curling Federation
 International Skating Union
 International Ice Hockey Federation
 International Luge Federation

Ice sports
Ice sports by year
Ice sports